The Canadian-American Challenge Cup or Can-Am raced on 30 different circuits in its history between 1966 and 1987. Mosport Park hosted 24 races over 18 seasons, the most of any track.

See also
 List of World Sportscar Championship circuits
 List of IMSA GT Championship circuits
 List of Pirelli World Challenge circuits
 List of American Le Mans Series circuits

External links
Racing Sports Cars Can-Am archive

Can-Am